Levi Barden Cobblestone Farmhouse is a historic home located at Seneca in Ontario County, New York. It is a cobblestone structure that was constructed in 1836 in the Greek Revival style.

It was listed on the National Register of Historic Places in 2003.

References

Houses on the National Register of Historic Places in New York (state)
Greek Revival houses in New York (state)
Cobblestone architecture in New York (state)
Houses completed in 1836
Houses in Ontario County, New York
National Register of Historic Places in Ontario County, New York